Brian Blados (born January 11, 1962) is a former American football offensive guard and offensive tackle who played nine seasons with the Cincinnati Bengals, Indianapolis Colts and Tampa Bay Buccaneers in the National Football League (NFL).  He attended Washington-Lee High School with Sandra Bullock, who was two years behind him.  His high school teammates called him "Mutton Head" because his head was "as big as a lamb and full of wool." Blados was the first 300lb offensive lineman to start in the NFL and played nine seasons, mostly with the Cincinnati Bengals, and was an integral part of the team that reached Super Bowl XXIII. Blados currently resides in the Cincinnati area.

References

External links
 

1962 births
Living people
American football offensive guards
American football offensive tackles
Cincinnati Bengals players
Indianapolis Colts players
North Carolina Tar Heels football players
Tampa Bay Buccaneers players
Sportspeople from Arlington County, Virginia
Players of American football from Virginia
Washington-Liberty High School alumni